The following is a list of squads for each nation competing at the 2017 FIBA Women's AmeriCup

Pool A

Source:

Source:

Source:

Source:

Source:

Pool B

Source:

Source:

Source:

Source:



References

FIBA Women's AmeriCup
FIBA Women's AmeriCup squads